Melissic acid (or triacontanoic acid) is the organic compound with the formula CH3(CH2)28CO2H. It is classified as a very long chain fatty acid, a subset of saturated fatty acids.  It is a white solid that is soluble in organic solvents.  Melissic acid gets its name from the Greek word melissa meaning bee, since it was found in beeswax.

Synthesis
n-Triacontanoic acid was synthesized by Bleyberg and Ulrich (1931) and by G.M. Robinson.

Self-assembly
Triacontanoic acid and triacontanamide (CH3(CH2)28-CONH2) can be self-assembled.

See also
List of saturated fatty acids

References

External links
Melissic acid at the Nature Lipidomics Gateway

Fatty acids
Alkanoic acids